Andrej Nestrasil (born February 22, 1991) is a Czech professional ice hockey player, who is currently playing under contract to HC Oceláři Třinec in the Czech Extraliga (ELH). Nestrasil was drafted 75th overall by the Detroit Red Wings in the 2009 NHL Entry Draft.

Playing career

Junior
Nestrasil was drafted by Victoriaville 8th overall in the 2008 CHL Import Draft. During the 2008–09 QMJHL season, Nestrasil skated for the QMJHL's Tigres in his first season in North America. Nestrasil was the second-leading scorer for the Tigres with 22 goals and 35 assists in 66 games. Victoriaville reached the playoffs after finishing third in the Central Division. Nestrasil recorded two goals and one assist in the four game series with Shawinigan.

During the 2009–10 QMJHL season, Nestrasil got off to a fast start for Victoriaville in his second season but his production slipped in the latter part of the season. Due to both a nagging injury late in January and the addition of five new forwards acquired by the Tigres in mid-season trades, he was limited late in the year; when the Tigres made a run to the QMJHL semifinals. Nestrasil had 43 points in the Tigres' first 44 games and finished with 16 goals and 35 assists in 50 regular season games. In 16 playoff games, Nestrasil recorded two goals and four assists.

During the 2010–11 QMJHL season, Nestrasil was acquired by Prince Edward Island in an off-season trade. Nestrasil was the second-leading scorer for the Rocket. Nestrasil recorded 19 goals and 51 assists, despite missing eight games in his third QMJHL season. Prince Edward Island reached the playoffs after finishing fourth in the Maritimes Division. Nestrasil scored one goal and five assists in the six-game playoff series with Shawinigan.

Professional
On May 31, 2011, the Detroit Red Wings signed Nestrasil to a three-year entry-level contract.

Nestrasil split his first pro season between the Red Wings' AHL and ECHL affiliates in Grand Rapids and Toledo. Nestrasil started the 2011–12 season with Toledo, was re-called by the Griffins, and after playing 11 games, was sent back to Toledo; before returning to Grand Rapids in late March. Nestrasil recorded three goals and one assist in 25 games for the Griffins. In 51 ECHL games with the Walleye, Nestrasil recorded seven goals and 22 assists.

During the 2012–13 season, Nestrasil appeared in 25 regular season games and one playoff contest for Detroit's AHL affiliate Grand Rapids in his second pro season, spending most of the year with the ECHL's Toledo Walleye. Nestrasil appeared in three December games and three January games, before joining Grand Rapids for an extended stay in the middle of February. Nestrasil scored three goals and three assists during the regular season. The Griffins finished first in the Midwest Division and captured the Calder Cup championship. Nestrasil made his only playoff appearance in Game 3 of the Western Conference finals. Nestrasil was a point-per-game scorer with Toledo. Nestrasil scored 11 goals and 30 assists in 40 regular season games and had one goal and two assists, in four ECHL playoff games.

During the 2013–14 season, in Nestrasil's first full season with the Griffins, he recorded 16 goals and 20 assists in 70 games.

On July 17, 2014, the Detroit Red Wings signed Nestrasil to a one-year contract.

On October 9, 2014, Nestrasil made his NHL debut for the Detroit Red Wings in a game against the Boston Bruins. On November 20, 2014, Nestrasil was placed on waivers by the Detroit Red Wings and claimed by the Carolina Hurricanes. He made his Hurricanes debut on November 22, 2014 scoring his first NHL goal against Reto Berra of the Colorado Avalanche. On January 8, 2015, Nestrasil was assigned to the Charlotte Checkers on a conditioning assignment.

On June 29, 2015, the Carolina Hurricanes re-signed Nestrasil to a two-year contract.

In the final year of his contract during the 2016–17 season, the Hurricanes placed Nestrasil on waivers on January 9, 2017 and assigned him to Charlotte the next day. At the conclusion of the season, Nestrasil was not retained by the Hurricanes as a restricted free agent, releasing him to free agency on June 26, 2017.

International play
Nestrasil represented the Czech Republic at the 2009 IIHF World U18 Championships. In six games for the sixth-place Czech Republic squad at the U18 WJC, Nestrasil scored two goals and two assists. He represented the Czech Republic at the 2010 World Junior Ice Hockey Championships. In six games he scored one goal and six assists. The Czech Republic missed the quarterfinals, finishing in seventh-place.

Nestrasil would next represent the Czech Republic at the 2011 World Junior Ice Hockey Championships. In six games he scored one goal and two assists, for a Czech Republic squad that finished seventh for the second straight year at the WJC.

Career statistics

Regular season and playoffs

International

References

External links

1991 births
Living people
Carolina Hurricanes players
Charlotte Checkers (2010–) players
Czech ice hockey right wingers
Detroit Red Wings draft picks
Detroit Red Wings players
Grand Rapids Griffins players
Metallurg Magnitogorsk players
HC Neftekhimik Nizhnekamsk players
HC Oceláři Třinec players
P.E.I. Rocket players
Ice hockey people from Prague
Toledo Walleye players
Victoriaville Tigres players
Czech expatriate ice hockey players in Russia
Czech expatriate ice hockey players in the United States
Czech expatriate ice hockey players in Canada